Yangfang Town is a town situated on southwestern Changping District, Beijing, China. Bounded by part of Taihang Mountain Range to the west, Yangfang shares border with Machikou Town in the north, Shangzhuang Town in the east, Sujiatuo Town in the south, and Liucun Town in the west. The population of Yangfang Town was 26,470 as of 2020.

The town originally took the name of Yangfang for its past location as a stopping point for trading caravans and sheep herders. Later the name was corrupted to Yangfang under the Republic of China.

History

Administrative divisions 

At the time of writing, Yangfang Town consists of 11 subdivisions, with 1 community, and 10 villages:

See also 

 List of township-level divisions of Beijing

References 

Changping District
Towns in Beijing